Strone is a village on the Cowal peninsula in Argyll and Bute in the Scottish Highlands at the point where the north shore of the Holy Loch becomes the west shore of the Firth of Clyde. The village lies within the Loch Lomond and The Trossachs National Park.

Origin of name
The name comes from the Scottish Gaelic for nose, and applies to the hill above the village as well as to Strone Point. It adjoins the settlement of Kilmun on the loch, and the village of Blairmore on Loch Long. It has a (now disused) pier (built in 1847) and was a regular stop for the Clyde steamer services.

Village

A high road on the side of the hill serves additional houses including Dunselma, a Scottish baronial style house above the point. It was built as a sailing lodge for the wealthy Coats family (proprietors of the eponymous Paisley mills) in 1885-7 by the Paisley firm of Rennison and Scott. It was bought by the Scottish Youth Hostels Association in 1941, and they used it as a hostel until 1965. It still forms a landmark clearly visible from the other side of the Clyde, and is a Category A listed building.
It is on the A880 road.

Gallery

References

External links

 Gaelic place names of Scotland - website 
 Towns in the Dunoon & Cowal area - website
 Geograph - website
 The Loch Lomond and The Trossachs National Park - website

Strone
Strone
Highlands and Islands of Scotland